Gae Magnafici is an American politician. She is a member of the Wisconsin Assembly, having served since 2018. She is a member of the Republican party.[1]

Born in Amery, Wisconsin, Gae grew up in Amery and graduated from Amery High School in 1970. She received her A.A. in Applied Science from Sauk Valley Community College in 1982.

References

Members of the Wisconsin State Assembly
21st-century American politicians